Anđelko Habazin (7 November 1924 – 6 October 1978) was a Croatian philosopher.

Anđelko Habazin was born in Zagreb (Croatia), where he graduated from the university with a degree in philosophy in 1954.  He received his doctorate degree in philosophy from the University of Sarajevo (Bosnia and Herzegovina) in 1962. He worked as a professor at the University of Banja Luka (Bosnia and Herzegovina), and then at the University of Zadar (Croatia) from 1974 until 1978. He died in Zadar, aged 54.

References

1924 births
1978 deaths
University of Zagreb alumni
University of Sarajevo alumni
Academic staff of the University of Banja Luka
Academic staff of the University of Zadar
Writers from Zagreb
20th-century Croatian philosophers
Yugoslav philosophers